Zakaria El Wardi (born 17 August 1998) is a professional Moroccan footballer, currently playing for Raja CA as a midfielder.

Honors
Raja CA 
Botola: 2019–20
CAF Confederation Cup: 2021
CAF Super Cup: 2019
Arab Champions Cup: 2020

Morocco U20
Jeux de la Francophonie: 2017

References

Moroccan footballers
Moghreb Tétouan players
Raja CA players
Living people
People from Tétouan
1998 births
Association football midfielders